Tony Xu (born Xu Xun, 1983/1984) is a Chinese-American billionaire businessman, and the co-founder and chief executive officer (CEO) of DoorDash. Born in Nanjing, China, Xu immigrated to the United States with his parents at the age of four. He earned degrees from the University of California, Berkeley and Stanford University's Graduate School of Business. Earlier in his career, Xu interned at Square, Inc., and worked for McKinsey & Company, eBay, and PayPal. He was included in Fortune "40 Under 40" list in 2020.

DoorDash had its IPO in December 2020 making Xu's net worth an estimated $2.8 billion as of April 2021. He and his wife Patti are signatories to the Giving Pledge.

Early life and education 
Xu was born in Nanjing, China. In 1989, his parents immigrated to Champaign, Illinois. His mother, Julie Cao, was previously a doctor in China. She later opened acupuncture and medical clinics in Champaign and the San Francisco Bay Area. His father was a professor in China who studied aerospace engineering and applied mathematics at the University of Illinois Urbana-Champaign, where he earned his Ph.D.

Xu began working at an early age, at times washing dishes at the same restaurant where his mother worked. He legally changed his name from Xu Xun to Tony Xu, inspired by his favorite television series Who's the Boss?, in which Tony Danza plays Tony Micelli. Xu earned his Bachelor of Science degree in industrial engineering and operations research from Berkeley's College of Engineering and his Master of Business Administration degree from Stanford's Graduate School of Business in 2013.

Career 

Early in his career, Xu interned at the financial services and digital payments company Square, Inc. and completed business development work for the e-commerce app RedLaser. He also worked as a business analyst for the management consulting firm McKinsey & Company, and as a corporate strategy consultant for eBay and PayPal.

Xu co-founded the delivery platform DoorDash in 2013 with Stanford classmates Andy Fang, Evan Moore, and Stanley Tang; the group had previously worked together to launch the predecessor delivery service PaloAltoDelivery.com in 2012. Xu has said his immigrant parents, and especially his mother's restaurant work, helped inspire DoorDash. Initially, he and other DoorDash employees completed food deliveries. Xu continues to be CEO, and owns an approximately five percent stake in the company. DoorDash's initial public offering in 2020, which Xu has been credited for leading, made him a billionaire at the age of 36. He has voting authority over all Class B shares, giving him control of DoorDash with 69 percent of the voting interest, as of December 2020.

In 2020, Xu was included in Fortune "40 Under 40" list.

Board service and investments 
In addition to DoorDash's board of directors, Xu is a board member of the Silicon Valley Chinese Association Foundation and an executive council member of TechNet.

In January 2022, Tony Xu joined the board directors of Meta Platforms.

Xu has invested in the blockchain technology provider Alchemy, as well as the ghost kitchens All Day Kitchens and Local Kitchens.

Charities 
Signatories to the Giving Pledge, he and his wife Patti have made significant donations in support of Berkeley, Northwestern, and the Asian American and Pacific Islander (AAPI) community.

Personal life 
Xu lives in San Francisco. He and his wife Patti met at church while they were undergraduates at Berkeley and married in 2013; the couple have two children.

Xu enjoys running and used to participate in marathons. He has described himself as an "avid" basketball fan, and has credited the sport and television for helping him learn English.

Publications

References

External links 
 Tony Xu at Bloomberg News
 
 
 
 , February 12, 2021, Stanford Graduate School of Business

1980s births
Living people
American billionaires
American chief executives
Chinese emigrants to the United States
EBay employees
Giving Pledgers
McKinsey & Company people
PayPal people
People from Champaign, Illinois
People from Nanjing
People from San Francisco
Stanford University alumni
UC Berkeley College of Engineering alumni
University of California, Berkeley alumni